KAGG (96.1 FM; Aggie 96) is a radio station broadcasting a country music format, licensed to Madisonville, Texas, United States, and serving Bryan and College Station. The station is owned by iHeartMedia, Inc.    The station's studios are located at Galleria Village on Briarcrest Drive in Bryan, with its transmitter atop the building.

History

The station went on the air (in testing mode) as KIXF on August 19, 1989. On October 23, 1989, the station changed its call sign to the current KAGG. “Aggie 96” began 24/7 operations at Noon, on December 5, 1989.

References

External links

AGG
Radio stations established in 1989
IHeartMedia radio stations